Congress Park is one of three stations on Metra's BNSF Line in Brookfield, Illinois. In Metra's zone-based fare system, Congress Park is in zone C. As of 2018, Congress Park is the 128th busiest of Metra's 236 non-downtown stations, with an average of 368 weekday boardings. Shelters are on both sides of the tracks. Metra trains serve Congress Park in the peak direction on weekdays only.

Bus connections
Pace

References

External links 

Station from Google Maps Street View

Metra stations in Illinois
Former Chicago, Burlington and Quincy Railroad stations
Brookfield, Illinois
Railway stations in Cook County, Illinois